Freddy vs. Jason: Original Motion Picture Score is the score album to the 2003 film Freddy vs. Jason. It was released on August 19, 2003, on Varèse Sarabande. The album was composed by Graeme Revell and performed by the City of Prague Philharmonic Orchestra, while three tracks which were performed by Machine Head.

Track listing

Original version

While as noted, all tracks performed by the City of Prague Philharmonic Orchestra.

Personnel 
 Paul Broucek – Executive in Charge of Music
 Mark Curry – Mixing Engineer
 Juraj Durovic – Engineer
 Boris Elkis – Programming
 Lindsay J. Harrington – Coordination
 Dominic Hauser – Orchestration
 Dora Hiller – Vocals
 Mario Klemens – Conductor
 Gregg Nestor – Music Preparation
 Melissa Osser – Vocals
 Josef Pokluda – Contractor
 Ashley Revell – Editing
 Graeme Revell – Producer
 Robert Revell – Guitar, Soloist
 Mitch Rotter – Executive
 David Russo – Programming
 Erin Scully – Executive
 Tim Simmonec – Orchestration
 Melanie Spore – Vocals
 Robert Townson – Executive Producer

See also
Freddy vs. Jason (album)

References

Film scores
Friday the 13th (franchise) music
A Nightmare on Elm Street (franchise) music
2003 soundtrack albums
Graeme Revell soundtracks
City of Prague Philharmonic Orchestra albums